Townshend State Forest covers  in Townshend, Vermont in Windham County. The forest is managed by the Vermont Department of Forests, Parks, and Recreation and surrounds 18-acre Townshend State Park, which hosts trails and camping facilities.

Activities in the forest include hiking, snowshoeing and hunting.

References

External links
Official website

Vermont state forests
Protected areas of Windham County, Vermont
Townshend, Vermont